Kowalewo may refer to the following places:
Kowalewo, Kuyavian-Pomeranian Voivodeship (north-central Poland)
Kowalewo, Mława County in Masovian Voivodeship (east-central Poland)
Kowalewo, Podlaskie Voivodeship (north-east Poland)
Kowalewo, Płock County in Masovian Voivodeship (east-central Poland)
Kowalewo, Chodzież County in Greater Poland Voivodeship (west-central Poland)
Kowalewo, Gniezno County in Greater Poland Voivodeship (west-central Poland)
Kowalewo, Grodzisk Wielkopolski County in Greater Poland Voivodeship (west-central Poland)
Kowalewo, Lubusz Voivodeship (west Poland)
Kowalewo, Pomeranian Voivodeship (north Poland)
Kowalewo, Warmian-Masurian Voivodeship (north Poland)
Kowalewo, West Pomeranian Voivodeship (north-west Poland)
Kowalewo Pomorskie, Kuyavian-Pomeranian Voivodeship (north central Poland)